Asanda may refer to:

Asanda, Haryana, a village in Bahadurgarh tehsil, Jhajjar district, Haryana, India
Asandas Classical Talkies, a film production company which produced Bhakta Nandanar

People with the given name
Asanda Sishuba (born 1980), South African footballer
Asanda Jezile (born 2001), British singer

See also
Asada (disambiguation)
Asana (disambiguation)